Raúl Enríquez Arámbula (born 20 May 1985) is a Mexican former professional footballer who played as a forward.

Career 
In 2007, Enríquez signed for second division side Club Tijuana.  Enríquez quickly became an integral member of the first-team, being the club's first-choice striker. During the 2010 Apertura, he helped the club gain promotion to the first division as Tijuana finished in first place in the regular campaign before defeating Veracruz 3–0 in the two-legged Liguilla final.  Two years later, Enríquez was lifting another league title with Tijuana, this time the Liga MX Apertura.  He is currently the club's all-time top goalscorer with 77 goals.

In 2013, Enríquez was loaned to Dorados de Sinaloa after six years with Tijuana; however, he returned to Tijuana after playing two matches with Sinaloa. After being loaned over the last two seasons, Raul was loaned to Juarez where he scored 19 goals and was the joint scorer in the league. He was link with clubs giant like Loros and Tampico Maderos, but he chose to stay with Juarez as his dream is to play with Tijuana again.

Personal life
On 12 September 2022, Enríquez was arrested at the Otay Mesa, San Diego, California checkpoint for allegedly trying to smuggle two undocumented individuals in the truck he was driving. He was reportedly driving a Cadillac pickup truck on his way to a game in Santa Ana, but was questioned by an agent when attempting to cross the border line, according to documents filed with the United States District Court for the Southern District of California.

Honours 
Tijuana
Liga MX: Apertura 2012
Ascenso MX: Apertura 2010

Dorados de Sinaloa
Ascenso MX: Clausura 2015

Individual
Top goalscorer: Primera A Apertura 2008, Copa MX Clausura 2015

References

External links
 
  
 
 
 

1985 births
Living people
Footballers from Colima
Association football forwards
Chiapas F.C. footballers
Salamanca F.C. footballers
Club Tijuana footballers
Dorados de Sinaloa footballers
Mineros de Zacatecas players
FC Juárez footballers
Liga MX players
Ascenso MX players
Mexican footballers